The Alien Factor is a Tom Swift and Hardy Boys Ultra Thriller novel.

Tom Swift encounters a strange young lady, who appears to be from outer space. The government starts to desire the mysterious girl, and the technology she possesses, and send their top agents, Frank and Joe Hardy, to go after her. But the three realize she is all the more prone to danger, and vow to protect her at all costs.

The Hardy Boys books
1993 American novels
1993 children's books
Children's science fiction novels